The Camden Line is a MARC commuter rail line that runs for  between Union Station, Washington, D.C., and Camden Station, Baltimore, Maryland, over the CSX Capital Subdivision, and Baltimore Terminal Subdivision. It is one of the oldest commuter lines in the United States still in operation. The Baltimore & Ohio Railroad began running commuter service from Baltimore to Ellicott City over part of the current line's trackage on May 24, 1830, and the line was extended to Washington on August 25, 1835.

Stations list

References

External links

MARC Camden Line official information page
Baltimore and Ohio Old Main Line and Washington Branch Photo Tours (TrainWeb)

 
MARC Train
Maryland railroads
Washington, D.C., railroads
Passenger rail transportation in Maryland
Passenger rail transportation in Washington, D.C.
Transportation in Baltimore
Railway lines opened in 1835
1835 establishments in Maryland
1835 establishments in Washington, D.C.